Tell Shemshara (ancient Shusharra) (also Tell Shimshara) is an archaeological site located along the Little Zab in Sulaymaniyah Governorate, northeastern Iraq. The site was inundated by Lake Dukan until recently.

The site was occupied, although not continuously, from the Hassuna period (early sixth millennium BCE) until the 14th century CE. A small archive recovered from the Middle Bronze Age layers (early second millennium BCE) revealed that, at least in that period, the site was called Shusharra and was the capital of a small, semi-independent Turukkean polity called māt Utêm or "land of the gatekeeper" ruled by a man called Kuwari acting as governor under a larger Hurrian state.

History of research 
The site was first recorded in 1955 during an archaeological survey of the Ranya Plain, which was to be flooded by the reservoir of the planned Dukan Dam. In 1957, a Danish team of archaeologists started a rescue excavation because the site would be flooded by Lake Dukan once the Dukan Dam would be finished. The Danish excavation was directed by Professors Harold Ingholt, who also excavated the citadel mound of Hama, and Jørgen Læssøe. It was funded by the Carlsberg Foundation and the Danish Government Foundation for the Promotion of Research. About 140 cuneform tablets were found in one location, believed to have been stored in a pot. The excavations were continued in 1958 and 1959 by Iraqi archaeologists of the State Board of Antiquities and Heritage (SBAH) under the direction of Abd al-Qadir at-Tekrîti. The work was never published but about 140 poorly preserved tablets were found in rooms near the findspot or the earlier tablets. The excavations have revealed that the site was occupied at least from the Hassuna period onward and the latest occupation phase dates to the 12th–14th centuries CE. The objects found during the Danish excavation were divided between the National Museum of Iraq and the National Museum of Denmark. So far, the prehistoric material of the Hassuna layers and the majority of the archives from the second millennium BCE have been published.

In 2012, teams of the Netherlands Institute for the Near East and the Central Zagros Archaeological Project (CZAP) conducted new investigations at the site, as part of a larger archaeological project focussing on the entire Ranya Plain. High water prevented work in 2016-2017 but in October 2018 low levels allowed a short season of work.

The site and its environment 
Tell Shemshara sits along the Little Zab, a tributary of the Tigris. Its strategic location in the northeastern corner of the Ranya Plain in the Zagros Mountains gave Shemshara control over travelling routes in all directions, particularly toward the north and east. Shemshara is a tell, or settlement mound, that can be divided in two parts; a high main mound and an elongated lower mound. Shemshara is now partially submerged under Lake Dukan. It has lost 164,000 cubic meters of volume to erosion since 1957 and at high water levels becomes an island.

Occupation history 
The excavations at the main mound revealed 16 occupation layers, ranging in date from the Hassuna period (early sixth millennium BCE) to the 14th century CE. A single radiocarbon sample from the basal level of the site, 3m below level 16, provided a date of 7320–7180 BC (IntCal13).

Hassuna Period
Layers 16–9 dated to the Hassuna period. This occupation was characterized by rows of stones that are interpreted by the excavators as foundations for mudbrick walls, a pebble floor and a clay basin in the final occupation layer. Pottery, which has only been found in abundance in layers 13–9, shows stylistic links with that of Hassuna and Tell es-Sawwan. Obsidian was the preferred material for stone tools, with flint making up only 15 percent of the total assemblage. Other artifacts that have been found at the site include stone bowls, bracelets and quern-stones and small objects made of bone.

Uruk and Jemdet Nasr Period
Whereas the main mound seems to have been abandoned after the Hassuna occupation, scarce archaeological material from the Uruk (fourth millennium BCE) and Jemdet Nasr periods (early third millennium BCE) has been found on the lower town.

Middle Bronze Age
Both the main mound and the lower extension were re-occupied during the Middle Bronze Age (early second millennium BCE). Layers 8–4 on the main mound can be assigned to this period, mainly Hurrian in nature. The excavations found a number of graves with bronze weapons on the main mound, as well as a mudbrick platform. In the lower town, a small part of a palace was excavated, and in three of its rooms a small archive of clay tablets was found. The palace was destroyed by fire, and through analysis of the archive it has been proposed that this happened in year 30 of the reign of Shamshi-Adad I of Assyria in the first quarter of the 18th century BCE.

The archive consisted of 146 clay tablets or fragments thereof, found in two groups, of which a small part dealt with the administration of the town, whereas the majority consisted of letters written to a certain Kuwari. Some fragments were part of the clay envelopes in which these letters were sent. The texts were written in Akkadian. These texts revealed that during this period the site was called Shusharra, that it was the capital of a polity called māt Utêm or "land of the gatekeeper" and that it was ruled by a man named Kuwari. Chronologically, the archive can be divided in two parts, one covering the period during which Shemshara was the capital of a small semi-independent kingdom, and one covering the period after Kuwari became a vassal of Shamshi-Adad, who at that time had already conquered Mari and Shubat-Enlil and was now campaigning in the Zagros Mountains. Together, these two periods do not last longer than 3 years. The letters in the Shemshara archive show that during this period, Kuwari had to deal with Turukkean refugees coming from the east and fleeing a war with Guteans; events which are also mentioned in the much larger archives found in Mari on the Syrian Euphrates.

Islamic Period
Layers 1-3 were Islamic.

See also 
Cities of the ancient Near East
Tell Bazmusian
Bestansur

Notes

References

Further reading 
 Soof, Behnam Abu., "Mounds in the Rania Plain and Excavations at Tell Basmusian (1956)", Sumer, vol. 26, pp.65-104, 1970

 Jorgen Lessee, I M 62 100 . A Letter From Tell Shemshara, in: Studies in Honor of Benno Landsberger, Assyriological Studies 16, Oriental Institute of Chicago, pp. 189–196, 1965
Jorgen Laessøe, The Shemshara tablets : a preliminary report, Arkaeologisk-Kunst historiske Meddelser udgivet of Det Kongelige Danske Videnskabernes Selskab, Bind 4, nr. 3, 1959
Jorgen Laessøe, The towers of Shemshara, G. Barjamovic et al., Akkade is King. A collection of papers by friends and colleagues presented to Aage Westenholz on the occasion of his 70th birthday 15 May 2009 (PIHANS 118), pp. 79–91, 2011

External links
NINO back in Iraq -Research on the Rania Plain in Iraqi Kurdistan, autumn 2015
Web site for current dig

Shemshara
Shemshara
Shemshara
Tells (archaeology)
Hassuna culture